Putative ATP-dependent RNA helicase DHX57 is an enzyme that in humans is encoded by the DHX57 gene.

References

Further reading